Çiğdem is a common feminine Turkish given name. In Turkish, "Çiğdem" means "Crocus", "Colchicum", and/or "Meadow Saffron".

 Çiğdem Balım Harding, American senior lecturer at Indiana University
 Çiğdem Belci (born 1987), Turkish footballer
 Çiğdem Can Rasna (born 1976), Turkish volleyball player
 Çiğdem Dede (born 1980), Turkish paralympic powerlifter
 Çiğdem Kağıtçıbaşı (1940–2017), Turkish scientist in social psychology 
 Çiğdem Özyaman (born 1985), Turkish sport shooter
 Çiğdem Talu (1939—1983), Turkish pop music songwriter
 Çiğdem, Balya, a village

Turkish feminine given names